Sign in the Sky is the second album by hard rock band China. It was released in 1989 by the label Vertigo. The single, "In the Middle of the Night", peaked at No. 11 on the Swiss Hitparade.

Track listing

Charts

Certifications

References

China (band) albums
1989 albums
Vertigo Records albums